The Chalvagne is a mountain river that flows through the Alpes-de-Haute-Provence department of southeastern France. Its source is in Val-de-Chalvagne, and it flows into the Var in Entrevaux.

References

Rivers of France
Rivers of Alpes-de-Haute-Provence
Rivers of Provence-Alpes-Côte d'Azur